Michael Allen (born 30 March 1949) is an English retired professional footballer who made over 230 appearances in the Football League, most notably for Brentford. A left back, he also played League football for Middlesbrough.

Playing career

Middlesbrough 
Born in South Shields, Allen began his career at Middlesbrough in 1966 and made his professional debut on 30 December 1967, in a 2–1 Second Division defeat to Bolton Wanderers. He scored his only goal for the club in a 1–1 FA Cup third round draw with Millwall on 4 January 1969. Allen failed to break through into the first team, with his best tally being 15 appearances during the 1969–70 season. He departed Ayresome Park a few months into the 1971–72 season, having made 38 appearances and scored one goal for Middlesbrough.

Brentford 
Allen dropped through the leagues to join Fourth Division high-flyers Brentford in October 1971, for a £10,000 fee. Operating as a midfielder, his 33 appearances during the 1971–72 season helped the club to a third-place finish and promotion to the Third Division. The Bees were relegated straight back to the Fourth Division and after moving to his preferred left back position in 1974, Allen put in a Player of the Year award-winning season in 1975–76, when he missed only one league match. Allen helped the club secure promotion back to the Third Division in 1977–78, with a fourth-place finish. He made just seven appearances in the Third Division and departed Griffin Park at the end of the 1978–79 season. Allen made 255 appearances and scored 13 goals during nearly 9 years with the Bees.

Whitby Town 
In 1979, Allen returned to his native northeast and ended his career with a spell as player-coach at Northern League club Whitby Town.

Personal life 
After retiring from football, Allen moved to Marton and worked for ICI Wilton.

Career statistics

Honours 
Brentford
 Football League Fourth Division third-place promotion: 1971–72
 Football League Fourth Division fourth-place promotion: 1977–78

Individual

Brentford Supporters' Player of the Year: 1975–76
 Brentford Players' Player of the Year: 1975–76

References

1949 births
Footballers from South Shields
English footballers
Brentford F.C. players
English Football League players
Middlesbrough F.C. players
Whitby Town F.C. players
Northern Football League players
Association football fullbacks
Association football midfielders
Living people